Zachary Kapono Wilson (born August 3, 1999) is an American football quarterback for the New York Jets of the National Football League (NFL). He played college football at BYU, and was selected second overall by the Jets in the 2021 NFL Draft.

Early life and high school
Wilson was born in Draper, Utah, on August 3, 1999. He attended Corner Canyon High School, where he played high school football. He passed for 2,986 yards and 24 touchdowns while also rushing for 752 yards and eight touchdowns as a senior. Wilson originally committed to play quarterback at Boise State University before later decommitting and choosing to attend Brigham Young University (BYU).

College career

2018 season

As a true freshman at BYU in 2018, Wilson played in nine games and made seven starts. He started his first career game against Hawaii, becoming the youngest quarterback to start a game for BYU. He finished the season having completed 120 of 182 passes for 1,578 yards with 12 touchdowns and three interceptions. He was named the MVP of the 2018 Famous Idaho Potato Bowl after completing all 18 of his passes for 317 yards and four touchdowns in the 49–18 victory over Western Michigan.

2019 season

As a sophomore in 2019, Wilson started nine games, completing 199 of 319 passes for 2,382 yards, 11 touchdowns and nine interceptions. That season, the Cougars were invited to the 2019 Hawaii Bowl, where Wilson was named BYU's MVP in the Cougars' 38–34 loss to Hawaii.

2020 season

Wilson started 12 games and completed 247 of 336 passes for 3,692 yards, 33 touchdowns and three interceptions while rushing for 255 yards and 10 touchdowns, breaking Steve Young's school completion percentage in a season at 73.5 percent. He helped lead BYU to a 10–1 regular season mark. He was named the offensive MVP of the 2020 Boca Raton Bowl after completing 26 of 34 passes for 425 yards and three touchdowns in the 49–23 victory over UCF. He and USC safety Talanoa Hufanga were selected as recipients of the 2020 Polynesian College Football Player of the Year Award.

Statistics

Professional career

A top quarterback prospect in the 2021 NFL Draft, Wilson was selected second overall by the New York Jets and was the second of five quarterbacks taken in the first round. He became the highest drafted player ever out of BYU. He signed a four-year deal on July 29, 2021, that was worth $35.15 million fully guaranteed, along with a $22.9 million signing bonus and a fifth year option.

2021

Wilson made his debut against the Carolina Panthers, facing him off with his Jets predecessor Sam Darnold. After throwing an interception in the first half, he finished with 258 passing yards, two touchdowns, and a rushing 2-point conversion, but the Jets lost 19–14. During the Jets' home opener in Week 2, Wilson threw four interceptions against the New England Patriots, including on his first two pass attempts. The Jets subsequently lost 25–6.

Following a 26–0 shutout loss to the Denver Broncos, in which he threw for 160 yards and two interceptions, Wilson earned his first career win against the Tennessee Titans in Week 4. Wilson had one interception, but also threw two touchdowns and completed 21 of 34 passes for 297 yards. One of his touchdowns was a 53-yard pass to wide receiver Corey Davis that gave the Jets a 24–17 lead in the fourth quarter, with the team going on to win 27–24 in overtime. Wilson threw his ninth interception during a Week 5 defeat to the Atlanta Falcons, making him the fourth NFL quarterback after DeShone Kizer, Zach Mettenberger, and Blake Bortles to be intercepted in each of his first five starts.

During Week 7 against the Patriots, Wilson suffered a knee injury in the second quarter after being hit by linebacker Matthew Judon. He was ruled out for the remainder of the game, with Mike White replacing him in the 54–13 loss. Following the defeat, it was announced that Wilson had a sprained posterior cruciate ligament in his right knee, which caused him to miss four games. Wilson returned in Week 12 and won his first road game over the Houston Texans. He also scored his first rushing touchdown during the game. Wilson lost four of his last five matchups, with his final win of the season coming against the Jacksonville Jaguars in Week 16. However, he improved his turnover differential by not throwing an interception in the five games. As a rookie, he appeared in 13 games and finished with 2,334 passing yards, nine passing touchdowns, and 11 interceptions to go along with 29 carries for 185 rushing yards and four rushing touchdowns.

2022

Wilson missed the first three games of 2022 season due to a non-contact bone bruise and meniscus tear he suffered in the preseason opener against the Philadelphia Eagles. He made his season debut in Week 4 against the Pittsburgh Steelers and despite throwing two interceptions, had a 2-yard receiving touchdown from wide receiver Braxton Berrios and led the Jets on a fourth quarter comeback drive to secure the 24–20 victory. The victory began a four-game winning streak for the Jets, although Wilson did not throw a touchdown pass in his next three games. New York's streak ended with a 22–17 loss to the New England Patriots, in which Wilson had a career-high 355 passing yards and two touchdowns, but also three interceptions. Wilson rebounded the following week when he completed 18 of 25 passes for 154 yards and a touchdown to help secure a 20–17 upset over the Buffalo Bills.

After completing only nine of 22 passes in a 10–3 loss to the Patriots the next week, Wilson was criticized for not attributing the loss to his performance. Wilson was subsequently demoted to the third-string backup behind Mike White and second-string backup Joe Flacco. Ahead of Week 15, he was promoted to the second option and started the Jets' next two games due to an injury to White. However, after struggling against the Jacksonville Jaguars during Week 16, Wilson was benched for Chris Streveler in the eventual 19–3 defeat. Wilson was demoted back to third-string behind White and Flacco following White's return. After the season Jets owner Woody Johnson said that despite taking Wilson with the number two overall pick that quarterback was "the missing piece" for the team moving forward.

NFL career statistics

Personal life
Wilson was born to Michael and Lisa Wilson and has three brothers and two sisters. He is part Hawaiian on his father's side, with his middle name Kapono meaning "righteous" in the Hawaiian language. Some other members of his family include airline entrepreneur David Neeleman and HealthEquity co-founder Stephen Neeleman. 

Wilson was diagnosed with attention deficit hyperactivity disorder (ADHD) as a child, a trait that runs in his family. Wilson was baptized as a member of The Church of Jesus Christ of Latter-Day Saints. He has said that he "didn’t grow up active in the church [and] was never really a churchgoer..." He considers himself a spiritual person, telling Deseret News "I have always had a good relationship with God in my life.”

Wilson has been friends with Washington Commanders wide receiver and former BYU Cougars teammate Dax Milne since childhood.

References

External links

 New York Jets bio
 BYU Cougars bio

1999 births
Living people
American football quarterbacks
BYU Cougars football players
Latter Day Saints from Utah
Native Hawaiian sportspeople
New York Jets players
People from Draper, Utah
Players of American football from Utah